Stolec (translation: throne, reigning chair ) (German Stolzenburg) is a village in the administrative district of Gmina Dobra, within Police County, West Pomeranian Voivodeship, in north-western Poland, close to the German border.

The village has an approximate population of 210.

References

Stolec